Sephora is a genus of true bugs in the family Cymidae. There is at least one described species in Sephora, S. criniger.

References

Further reading

 
 
 
 

Lygaeoidea